USCGC Cape Fox (WPB-95316) was a Type B  of the United States Coast Guard. Built at the Coast Guard Yard in Curtis Bay, Baltimore the vessel was commissioned on August 22, 1955.

Service history
The ship was stationed at New London, Connecticut, until transferred to Riviera Beach, Florida, in 1964. After a major refit in 1980-82, she replaced the Cape York in late 1981 after the Cuban Boatlift in Key West, Florida, apart from the period between December 1983 to February 1984, when she conducted surveillance operations from St. George's, Grenada. The principal duties of Cape Fox were search and rescue and law enforcement operations; she was credited with numerous seizures of shipments of illegal drugs.

The ship was decommissioned on June 30, 1989, and transferred to The Bahamas, where she served in the Royal Bahamas Defence Force under the name HMBS San Salvador II (P10) until 1999.

References

1955 ships
Ships built by the United States Coast Guard Yard
Fox
Cape-class cutters of the Royal Bahamas Defence Force